Women's artistic individual all-around competition at the 2008 Summer Olympics was held on August 15. at the Beijing National Indoor Stadium.

For each competitor in the women's qualification, the scores for all four apparatus were summed to give an all-around qualification score. The top 24 competitors moved on to the individual all-around final, though nations were limited to two competitors each even if more qualified. In the individual all-around final, each gymnast competed on each apparatus again. Only scores from the final were used to determine final rankings.

Qualifying

Final round results 

Source: The Beijing Organizing Committee for the Games of the XXIX Olympiad

Remaining placings

References

External links
NYT Report

Gymnastics at the 2008 Summer Olympics
2008
Olympics
2008 in women's gymnastics
Women's events at the 2008 Summer Olympics